The Women's International Zionist Organization (WIZO) is a volunteer organization dedicated to social welfare in all sectors of Israeli society, the advancement of the status of women, and Jewish education in Israel and the Diaspora.

History

WIZO was founded in England on 7 July 1920 by Rebecca Sieff, Dr. Vera Weizmann (wife of Israel's first president, Dr. Chaim Weizmann), Edith Eder, Romana Goodman and Henrietta Irwell to provide community services for the residents of Mandate Palestine.

WIZO branches opened across Europe, such as that run by Julia Batino in Macedonia, but many were closed down in the wake of Nazi occupation and the Holocaust. Branches in Latin America continued to operate during the war.

In 1949, after the establishment of the State of Israel, WIZO moved its headquarters to Israel and Sieff became president of the world WIZO organization. In 1966 Sieff died, she was replaced by Rosa Ginossar, who had been acting President since 1963. Other past presidents include Raya Jaglom and Michal Har'el Modai, former Miss Israel and wife of Israeli politician Yitzhak Moda'i.

Presidents Evelyn Sommer (WIZO) and Ilana Ben Ami (WIZO Israel) tried to negotiate with Mexican president Luis Echeverría in 1975 to dissuade him from condemning Zionism as Racism during the World Conference on Women in Mexico. Despite Echeverría's promises, UN General Assembly, after the impulse of Arab countries and the support of the Non-Aligned Movement countries and the Soviet bloc, adopted Resolution 3379 against Zionism. Almost 20 years had to pass before the UN Resolution 46/86 revoked the 1975 determination. 

Among WIZO's early social welfare projects in Mandatory Palestine were the establishment of Tipat Halav well-baby clinics and clothing distribution centers, many still in operation today. WIZO opened the country's first day care center in Tel Aviv in 1926.

In 2008, WIZO, together with two other Women's organizations, received the Israel Prize for its lifetime achievements and special contribution to society and the State of Israel.

Political activity in Israel

WIZO formed a party and ran for Knesset in Israel's first elections in 1949, receiving 1.2% of the vote. It won one seat and was represented by Rachel Cohen-Kagan, chairwoman of WIZO at the time. Cohen-Kagan later ran in elections for the fifth Knesset as a member of the Liberal Party (though she was a member of the group that broke away to form the Independent Liberals).

Today

Today, WIZO runs 180 day care centers in Israel, caring for 14,000 children of working mothers, new immigrants and needy families. The organization also runs summer camps, courses for single-parent families and therapeutic frameworks for children removed from their homes by court order.

WIZO is now the largest women's Zionist organization in the world. In 2008, 36 member countries sent delegates to Israel to celebrate the organization's 88th birthday.

The current World WIZO president is Esther Mor, who replaced Tova Ben-Dov,  in 2016.

See also
List of Israel Prize recipients
WIZO Haifa Academy of Design and Education

References

External links
Official website (in English)

Jewish organizations
Organizations established in 1920
Women's organizations based in Israel
Israel Prize recipients that are organizations
Israel Prize for lifetime achievement & special contribution to society recipients
Women's rights organizations
Defunct political parties in Israel
International women's organizations
Jewish women's organizations
World Zionist Organization